The 2019 KNSB Dutch Sprint Championships in speed skating were held in Heerenveen at the Thialf ice skating rink from 26 January to 27 January 2019. The tournament was part of the 2018–2019 speed skating season. Hein Otterspeer and Jutta Leerdam won the sprint titles. The sprint championships were held at the same time as the 2019 KNSB Dutch Allround Championships.

Schedule

Medalist

Men's sprint

Women's sprint

Classification

Men's sprint

Women's sprint

Source:

References

KNSB Dutch Sprint Championships
KNSB Dutch Sprint Championships
2019 Sprint